General elections were held in Singapore on 3 September 1988. President Wee Kim Wee dissolved parliament on 17 August 1988 on the advice of Prime Minister Lee Kuan Yew. The result was a victory for the People's Action Party, which won 80 of the 81 seats.

Though the total eligible voter population surpassed one million in 1976, the 1988 elections was the first time that over one million voters were able to vote in contested constituencies. This was not repeated until 2006.

Overview
Group Representation Constituencies were introduced in this general election to ensure ethnic minority representation in Parliament, starting with three member constituencies. This was the last time Prime Minister Lee Kuan Yew led the PAP in an election and another two stalwarts, former Deputy Prime Minister Dr Toh Chin Chye and Senior Minister S. Rajaratnam, retired for the PAP's renewal process.

This was also the first election where changes to electoral boundaries were approved by the Prime Minister's Office instead of tabling a bill 
in Parliament to approve changes.

Two seats were vacated in 1986 but neither held its by-elections - Workers' Party (WP) Member of Parliament and leader J. B. Jeyaretnam (of Anson) and PAP incumbent Teh Cheang Wan (of Geylang West), vacated its seats due to conviction over falsified party accounts, and suicide over investigations for corruption, respectively.
WP absorbed the two parties, Barisan Sosialis (BS) and Singapore United Front to become the largest opposition party and also allied with the Malay party PKMS as one faction. The election also saw the debut of WP candidate Low Thia Khiang in Tiong Bahru Group Representation Constituency. While Low failed to capture a seat on his first outing, he would later go on to win Hougang Single Member Constituency in the next election and become the party's secretary-general as well as one of the longest-serving opposition leaders until 2020.

With the Singapore Democratic Party leader's Chiam See Tong sole victory in the seat of Potong Pasir, two Non-Constituency MP seats were offered to former solicitor-general and Law Society president, Francis Seow and veteran politician Dr Lee Siew Choh, both of which were standing under the WP ticket in Eunos Group Representation Constituency; their campaign was notable for criticizing PAP for alleged dubious financial circumstances; in response Minister of State Tay Eng Soon went to lead their PAP team for Eunos. Despite losing by a narrow margin of 49.1%-50.9%, WP were eligible for the NCMP; however, Seow fled the country on 17 December to avoid arrest and was disqualified from the post while Lee took up the offer and became Singapore's first NCMP, marking Lee's return to Parliament after 25 years since his last stint as a PAP and BS legislator. Once again, there was a significant increase of election deposit.

In November 1990, two years after the election, the Nominated MP scheme was implemented to introduce non-partisan voices into the legislature. Although the law allowed up to six NMPs, two were appointed at the start and served for a year before the Parliament term ended.

Timeline

Electoral boundaries

1988 was the first election in Singapore's history to introduce the Group Representation Constituency (GRC) scheme, which were formed with series of three (later elections increases up to six) constituencies/divisions with at least one minority member representing to ensure ethnic minority representation in Parliament, thus cumulating the effects with Plurality-at-large voting. Additionally, single member constituencies (SMC) were either formed from or absorbed to neighboring constituencies due to development and electorate, which was shown in the table below:

New candidates
A Nasser Kamaruddin
Chay Wai Chuen
Charles Chong
Choo Wee Khiang
Davinder Singh
George Yeo Yong-Boon
Hong Hai
John Chen Seow Phun
K Shanmugam
Lew Syn Pau
Loh Meng See
Low Seow Chay
Mah Bow Tan
Ong Chit Chung
Peh Chin Hua
Peter Sung
Seet Ai Mee

Retiring candidates

Results

By constituency

Notes

References

Singapore
General elections in Singapore
1988 in Singapore